Hypocystina is a subtribe of butterflies.

 Argynnina Butler, 1867
 Argyronympha Mathew, 1886
 Argyrophenga Doubleday, 1845
 Dodonidia Butler, 1884
 Erebiola Fereday, 1878
 Erycinidia Rothschild & Jordan, 1905 - includes Pieridopsis
 Geitoneura Butler, 1867
 Harsiesis Fruhstorfer, 1911
 Heteronympha Wallengren, 1858 - includes Hipparchioides
 Hyalodia Jordan, 1924
 Hypocysta Westwood, 1851
 Lamprolenis Godman & Salvin, 1881
 Nesoxenica Waterhouse & Lyell, 1914  
 Oreixenica Waterhouse & Lyell, 1914
 Paratisiphone Watkins, 1928
 Percnodaimon Butler, 1876
 Platypthima Rothschild & Jordan, 1905 - includes Altiapa
 Tisiphone Hübner, 1819  - includes Xenica
 Zipaetis Hewitson, 1863

References 

Satyrini
Lepidoptera subtribes